The 2020 Louisville Cardinals baseball team represents the University of Louisville during the 2020 NCAA Division I baseball season. The Cardinals play their home games at Jim Patterson Stadium.

Previous season

The Cardinals finished the 2019 season with a 51–18 record, compiling a 21–9 mark in the ACC.

2019 MLB Draft
The Cardinals had eight players drafted in the 2019 MLB draft.

Players in bold are signees drafted from high school that will attend Louisville.

Personnel

Roster

Coaching Staff

References

Louisville
Louisville Cardinals baseball seasons
Louisville baseball